Joshua Nisbet (born 15 June 1999), is an Australian professional footballer who plays as a for Central Coast Mariners. He can play in several positions including defensive midfield, attacking midfield or as a forward. He can also play as a winger.

Career

Central Coast Mariners
Nisbet made his professional debut for the Central Coast Mariners on 1 August 2018 in a FFA Cup match against Adelaide United, starting the game before being replaced at the second-half by Peter Kekeris. He made his first league appearance for the Mariners as a second-half substitute in a Round 15 clash against Newcastle Jets in the F3 Derby, the Mariners going on to lose the game 1–0. On 30 January 2019, he signed his maiden professional contract with the Central Coast. In the 2020–21 season, Nisbet started 24 times and provided 3 assists. In the 2021-22 season, Josh Nisbet played 25 matches and scored 1 goal. In June 2022 he signed a new contract for an additional 2 years.

International
Nisbet was called up to the Australian under-23 team for the 2022 AFC U-23 Asian Cup in June 2022.

References

External links

1999 births
Living people
Australian soccer players
Association football midfielders
Central Coast Mariners FC players
National Premier Leagues players